Park Byung-Won (born 2 September 1983) is a South Korean footballer who plays as midfielder for Goyang Hi FC in K League Challenge.

Career
He was selected by FC Anyang in 2013 K League Draft.

References

External links 

1983 births
Living people
Association football midfielders
South Korean footballers
Goyang KB Kookmin Bank FC players
FC Anyang players
Goyang Zaicro FC players
Korea National League players
K League 2 players